The HVDC Hellsjön–Grängesberg is a test range from ABB between Hellsjön and Grängesberg to the testing of new components for HVDC. It consists of a 10 kilometer long overhead line, which was originally used as three-phase alternating current line and which is occasionally used for DC transmissions. The maximum transmission rate of the HVDC Hellsjön–Grängesberg is 3 megawatt, the operating voltage 10 kV (symmetrical against earth). When it was first built in 1893, it was the first Swedish power station to make use of the three-phase electric power system which had been invented only a few years earlier by the Swedish inventor Jonas Wenström.

Sites

Waypoints

External links
 https://web.archive.org/web/20120402032021/http://www.abb.com/industries/ap/db0003db004333/f9f63434f160425ac125774a00348aa6.aspx

HVDC transmission lines
Electric power infrastructure in Sweden
Energy infrastructure completed in 1983
1983 establishments in Sweden